Mark Yeary is an engineer at the University of Oklahoma in Norman. He was named a Fellow of the Institute of Electrical and Electronics Engineers (IEEE) in 2016 for his contributions to radar systems in meteorology.

References

Fellow Members of the IEEE
Living people
Year of birth missing (living people)
Place of birth missing (living people)
University of Oklahoma faculty